Lokogoma (or 'Lokogoma Cadastral Zone C09') is a residential area of Abuja, the capital city of Nigeria. It is 30 minutes from the Nnamdi Azikiwe International Airport  and 25 minutes from the city centre and It is still in development.

Lokogoma has undergone a lot of development over the recent years and with this has come a significant increase in population. A number of gated housing estates have sprung up along the Lokogoma expressway.

History 
The word Loko goma, is a Hausa word that means ten (10) streets. Lokogoma started when the former minister of Abuja created more land for people seeking land outside the city centre. In May 2022, some Abuja Okada riders set houses on fire in Lokogoma over colleagues’ death.

Neighborhood overview 
As of January 2021, there are numerous places for residents to obtain needed items as well as places to relax. These include grocery outlets, sit-outs, eateries, mini shopping outlets, bars and fruit stores.

Prospects for Lokogoma

Lokogoma is arguably the fastest growing district in the Federal Capital Territory of Nigeria. It has over 35 estates within the lokogoma districts alone. It is largely a residential lay out with a few plazas for commerce and business. This makes it a densely populated location and suitable for products in the category of FMCGs. Recently, in 2020, during the covid-19 pandemic, a website was created to serve the locality and the neighbouring districts. The website is tagged lokogoma.com (which is same with the URL): lokogoma.com is built and managed primarily for the purpose of promoting businesses, products, services and brands within and around lokogoma. In order to promote and support start ups and small businesses in the district, registration unto the website is for free. Lokogoma.com and its related social media platforms provides updates for accommodation, property, recruitment, training, to mention a few. The website is being managed by a private firm.

References

Abuja
Housing in Nigeria